30 Raffles Place, formerly called Chevron House and Caltex House, is a high-rise skyscraper located in the central business district of Singapore. It is located on 30 Raffles Place, in the financial district of Raffles Place. The development has direct underground access to Raffles Place MRT station. 16 Collyer Quay, a nearby neighbour of 30 Raffles Place, shares a four-level retail podium with the building.

The international headquarters of Caltex is situated in the building.

History
30 Raffles Place was designed by Murphy/Jahn, Inc. Architects and Architects 61, and was completed in 1993, just one year after its next-door neighbour, 16 Collyer Quay. The other firms involved in the development are CapitaLand Commercial Limited, Savu Investments Private Limited, CapitaLand, Obayashi Gumi Corporation, Sendai Eversendai Engineering Group, Steen Consultants Private Limited, PCR Engineers Private Limited, Chevalier Group, PCR Engineers Private Limited, Rider Hunt Levett & Bailey, and Toshiba Elevator and Building Systems Corporation.

Goldman Sachs acquisition
In September 2007, a Goldman Sachs-linked fund bought Chevron House, at a price of S$730 million. This equates to $2,780 per square foot ($29,924/m2) of net lettable area. This is Goldman Sachs' second major acquisition of an office property in Singapore. It will allow CapitaLand to have a profit of about $150.8 million from the sale of its stake.

Before the sale, Chevron House was owned by several companies. CapitaLand, IP Property Fund Asia and NTUC Income Insurance Co-operative had a stake of 50 per cent, 25 per cent and 25 per cent respectively. A few months later, its neighbour 16 Collyer Quay was also bought by Goldman Sachs.

Architecture
30 Raffles Place  models the late-modernist architectural style, and is similar to that of Springleaf Tower and Hitachi Tower. It is mainly built out of aluminium, glass and steel. A distinctive glass rotunda and four-storey high portico is located at the entrance of the building. The rotunda motif is expressed on the roof, capped by radial sunshading louvres. This strong feature that distincts the building from other skyscrapers in Raffles Place.

Tenants
Major tenants of Chevron House includes Planet Fitness. Planet Fitness occupies  of space in the building. It is primarily used as a gym, and has a mezzanine interior with large windows.

See also
List of tallest buildings in Singapore

References

External links

Skyscraper office buildings in Singapore
Downtown Core (Singapore)
Office buildings completed in 1993
Helmut Jahn buildings
20th-century architecture in Singapore